Amit Zenati (born 2 April 1997) is an Israeli football player who plays for Maccabi Bnei Reineh.

Club career
He made his professional debut in the 2016–17 UEFA Europa League for Maccabi Haifa F.C. on 21 July 2016 in the second-round qualifying round return game against the Estonian club Nõmme Kalju FC, when he came on as a substitute in the 89th minute. Both games ended with a score of 1–1, necessitating a penalty shoot-out. Zenati was the only player whose shot was saved by the goalkeeper in the shootout, and as a result, Maccabi were eliminated from the competition.

References

External links
 
 

1997 births
Living people
Israeli footballers
Maccabi Haifa F.C. players
Bnei Yehuda Tel Aviv F.C. players
Maccabi Bnei Reineh F.C. players
Footballers from Ashdod
Israeli Premier League players
Association football forwards